Oreoicidae is a newly recognized family of small insectivorous songbirds from New Guinea and Australia, commonly known as the Australo-Papuan bellbirds. The family contains three genera, each containing a single species: Aleadryas, which contains the rufous-naped bellbird; Ornorectes, which contains the piping bellbird; and Oreoica, which contains the crested bellbird.

Taxonomy and systematics
The three species contained in the family have been moved around between different families for fifty years, including the Colluricinclidae (shrike-thrushes), Falcunculidae (shrike-tits) and Pachycephalidae (whistlers). A series of studies of the DNA of Australian birds between 2001 and 2006 found strong support for treating the three genera as a new family, which was formally named in 2016 (although the name had first been proposed by Sibley and Ahlquist in 1985).

Within the passerines, the relationship of the Australo-Papuan bellbirds to other bird families has been difficult to establish; they have been thought to be close to a range of families including the cuckoo-shrikes, whistlers, mottled berryhunter, painted berrypeckers, butcherbirds and woodswallows, and Old World orioles.

Taxonomic list
 Aleadryas 
Aleadryas rufinucha, rufous-naped bellbird (formerly rufous-naped whistler)
 Ornorectes 
Ornorectes cristatus, piping bellbird (formerly crested pitohui)
 Oreoica 
 Oreoica gutturalis, crested bellbird

Description
The family shares a small number of characteristics. They also all have semi-erectile crests and shrike-like bills. The plumage is either the same between the sexes (as in the rufous-naped and piping bellbird) or slightly different (as in the crested bellbird).

Distribution and habitat
The family occupies a range of habitats. Two species, the rufous-naped bellbird and the piping bellbird, are endemic to New Guinea, whilst the crested bellbird is endemic to Australia. The two New Guinean species are found in rainforest; lowland and hill forest in the piping bellbird, or montane forest and secondary forest in the case of the rufous-naped bellbird. The crested bellbird occupies drier habitats in Australia including dry woodlands and scrublands.

Vocalization 

All members of Oreoicidae have melodious piping songs consisting of rhythmically repeating ringing notes of different lengths, typically mostly or all at the same pitch. The bell-like quality of their songs is the source of the common name bellbird, which was first applied to the crested bellbird and more recently to the other two species, once their close relationship to the crested bellbird, and distant relationship to whistlers (in the case of rufous-naped bellbird) and other pitohuis (in the case of piping bellbird), was revealed. The rufous-naped bellbird also makes harsh rasping calls.

One aboriginal name for the crested bellbird is "panpanpanella," an onomatopoeia of its rhythmic song. Early European settlers called the bird "dick-dick-the-devil," another onomatopeia.

The ornithologist John Gould (and the naturalist John Gilbert) described the song of the crested bellbird thusly:

References 

 
Bird families
 
 
Higher-level bird taxa restricted to New Guinea